The 1994 Derby City Council election took place on 5 May 1994 to elect members of Derby City Council in England. Local elections were held in the United Kingdom in 1994. This was on the same day as other local elections. The Labour Party gained control of the council, which had previously been under no overall control.

Overall results

|-
| colspan=2 style="text-align: right; margin-right: 1em" | Total
| style="text-align: right;" | 15
| colspan=5 |
| style="text-align: right;" | 54,510
| style="text-align: right;" |

Ward results

Abbey

Allestree

Alvaston

Babington

Blagreaves

Boulton

Breadsall

Darley

Littleover

Mackworth

Mickleover

Normanton

Osmaston

Sinfin

Spondon

References

1994 English local elections
May 1994 events in the United Kingdom
1994
1990s in Derbyshire